Marvin Tomás Ávila (born 6 December 1985) is a Guatemalan footballer who plays as a midfielder for Liga Nacional club Sololá and the Guatemala national team.

Club career
Nicknamed "Titi Man", Ávila made his mark in the 2007 Clausura season, considered a breakthrough season for the winger, scoring six goals including a hat-trick against Deportivo Petapa. His form and quick rise for both his club and the national team were the main reasons behind his move to Guatemala's biggest club, Municipal, for the 2007-08 season. On his debut for Municipal in the 2007 Apertura against his former club, CD Suchitepéquez, he scored the winning goal, a spectacular one-time volley off a corner from Freddy García.

In 2009, he had a short stint at Chinese side Shaanxi Chanba, being the first Guatemalan player ever to play for a club in Asia. He then returned to Municipal.

International career
Ávila made his international debut as a late substitute in a match against the United States in a pre-World Cup friendly in February 2006. He scored his first goal for the Guatemalan senior side in a friendly match against Honduras later that year. On 17 October 2007, in a game against the Mexico national team, he came of age at the international level, scoring a brace (first the equalizer and then the winner) and setting up an earlier goal. This superb performance helped Guatemala beat Mexico for the first time in almost seven years. As of January 2010, he had collected 24 caps, scored three goals and represented Guatemala in two FIFA World Cup qualification matches. He also played at the 2007 CONCACAF Gold Cup.

In 2007 and 2008 he was part of Guatemala's under-23 team scoring the winning goal against Haiti, and although the Guatemala National Team started the tournament off strong, they slowly began to lose momentum and  eventually fell short of qualifying for the 2008 Olympic tournament.

International goals
Scores and results list Guatemala's goal tally first.

References

External links
 

1985 births
Living people
People from Izabal Department
Guatemalan footballers
Guatemalan expatriate footballers
Guatemala international footballers
C.D. Suchitepéquez players
C.S.D. Municipal players
Beijing Renhe F.C. players
Chinese Super League players
2007 UNCAF Nations Cup players
2007 CONCACAF Gold Cup players
2014 Copa Centroamericana players
Association football midfielders
Guatemalan expatriate sportspeople in China
Expatriate footballers in China